Club de Fútbol Recambios Colón Catarroja, sometimes referred to as Recambios Colón Club Deportivo, known as Recambios Colón, is a Spanish football team based in Catarroja, in the Valencian Community. Founded in 2003, it plays in Tercera División RFEF – Group 6, holding home matches at Complex Poliesportiu El Perdiguer in Aldaia.

History
Founded in 2003 as a football section for workers of the company with the same name, Recambios Colón played in Catarroja until moving to Sedaví. In 2015, they first reached Tercera División after achieving promotion from the Regional Preferente in the play-offs.

In 2017, Recambios Colón changed name from CF Recambios Colón Valencia to CF Recambios Colón Catarroja, to reflect the original location of the company which owns the club. They suffered relegation in 2018, but returned to the fourth tier immediately after finishing first of their group in Preferente.

Club background
Club de Fútbol Recambios Colón Valencia – (2003–2017)
Club de Fútbol Recambios Colón Catarroja – (2017–present)

Season to season

5 seasons in Tercera División
1 season in Tercera División RFEF

Stadium
After playing in Catarroja in the club's beginnings, Recambios Colón played at the Estadio Polideportivo Municipal de Sedaví in Sedaví (with a capacity of 1,000 people), until 2017, when they moved to the Complex Poliesportiu El Perdiguer (with the same capacity) in Aldaia.

References

External links
Soccerway team profile

Football clubs in the Valencian Community
Association football clubs established in 2003
2003 establishments in Spain
Province of Valencia
Works association football teams